Radio SRF Musikwelle is the sixth radio station from Schweizer Radio und Fernsehen (SRF) and is broadcast in German-speaking Switzerland.

External links 

1996 establishments in Switzerland
Radio stations established in 1996
German-language radio stations in Switzerland